Mike Ellery (born 8 September 1989 in Penrith, England) is an English professional rugby union player. He plays at wing for Saracens. He also plays for the England national rugby sevens team.

References

External links
Premiership Rugby Profile
Saracens Profile

1989 births
Living people
English rugby union players
Saracens F.C. players
England international rugby sevens players
Rugby sevens players at the 2014 Commonwealth Games
Commonwealth Games rugby sevens players of England
Commonwealth Games medallists in rugby sevens
Commonwealth Games bronze medallists for England
Rugby union players from Penrith, Cumbria
Medallists at the 2018 Commonwealth Games